Aphrosylus aculeatus is a species of fly in the family Dolichopodidae.

Distribution
Italy.

References

Hydrophorinae
Insects described in 1979
Diptera of Europe